Bernard David Gallagher (July 22, 1925 – October 1, 2003) was a farmer and political figure in Saskatchewan. He represented Yorkton from 1960 to 1971 in the Legislative Assembly of Saskatchewan as a Liberal.

He was born in Yorkton, Saskatchewan, the son of Fergal Gallagher and Alberta O'Toole, both of Irish descent, and was educated in Yorkton. In 1949, he married Dorothy Jean Lang.

References 

Saskatchewan Liberal Party MLAs
1925 births
2003 deaths
People from Yorkton